Marine Geology is a peer-reviewed scientific journal about marine geology published by Elsevier. About its scope the journal states "We accept papers on subjects as diverse as seafloor hydrothermal systems, beach dynamics, early diagenesis, microbiological studies in sediments, palaeoclimate studies and geophysical studies of the seabed.".

External links 
 

Geology journals
English-language journals
Marine geology